The Benjamin Aborn Jackson House is an historic house at 115 Nayatt Road in Barrington, Rhode Island.  The -story brick house was designed by architect Norman M. Isham and completed in 1913 for Benjamin Aborn Jackson, a Rhode Island banking and railroad executive.  The house is a rare survivor of the development of Nayatt Point as a resort area.  The L-shaped building is set well back from Nayatt Road, and is not far from the Nayatt Point Light.

The house was listed on the National Register of Historic Places in 2008.

See also
National Register of Historic Places listings in Bristol County, Rhode Island

References

External links
 A Gilded-Age Mansion on the Shores of Narragansett Bay Photos and description from Curbed. Retrieved 31 May 2014.

Houses on the National Register of Historic Places in Rhode Island
Houses in Bristol County, Rhode Island
Buildings and structures in Barrington, Rhode Island
National Register of Historic Places in Bristol County, Rhode Island
Houses completed in 1913